Bacula morisyuichiroi is a species of sea snail, a marine gastropod mollusc in the family Eulimidae. The species is one of three other species known to exist within this genus of gastropods, the other species are Bacula lamberti and Bacula striolata.

References

External links
 To World Register of Marine Species

Eulimidae
Gastropods described in 1968